The Eleuterio Derkes Grammar School is a historic school building in Guayama, Puerto Rico. It was built in 1908, during a period when schools were gaining importance as civic institutions in Puerto Rico. Its simplified Neoclassical design emphasized this shift, and it became a prototype for a generation of school construction on the island. It additionally signifies a transition in construction technologies from wood to concrete. In 1987, architect Jorge Rigau observed that the building had survived in a nearly unaltered state, a rarity among schools of its era.

It was inscribed on the National Register of Historic Places in 1987.

See also
National Register of Historic Places listings in southern Puerto Rico

References

External links

, National Register of Historic Places cover documentation

School buildings on the National Register of Historic Places in Puerto Rico
School buildings completed in 1908
1908 establishments in Puerto Rico
Neoclassical architecture in Puerto Rico
National Register of Historic Places in Guayama, Puerto Rico
Elementary schools in Puerto Rico